The women's dual moguls at the 2017 Asian Winter Games was held on 24 February 2017 at Bankei Ski Area in Sapporo, Japan.

Schedule
All times are Japan Standard Time (UTC+09:00)

Results

Qualification

Knockout round

References

External links
Results at FIS website

Women's dual moguls